Kyuyorelyakh (Küöreleex ) is a rural locality (a selo), the only inhabited locality, and the administrative center of Oktyabrsky Rural Okrug of Gorny District in the Sakha Republic, Russia, located  from Berdigestyakh, the administrative center of the district. Its population as of the 2010 Census was 541, down from 573 recorded during the 2002 Census.

References

Notes

Sources
Official website of the Sakha Republic. Registry of the Administrative-Territorial Divisions of the Sakha Republic. Gorny District. 

Rural localities in Gorny District